The Central District of Asaluyeh County is in Bushehr province, Iran. At the 2006 census, its population was 54,320 in 6,557 households, at which time the constituent parts of the region were in the former Asaluyeh District of Kangan County. The following census in 2011 counted 65,584 people in 10,364 households. The district's establishment was officially announced on 12 December 2012. At the latest census in 2016, the district had 56,255 inhabitants living in 12,224 households.

References 

Districts of Bushehr Province
Populated places in Asaluyeh County